Robert Donald Graham, better known as Bob Graham (born 20 October 1942), is an Australian author and illustrator of picture books, primarily for very young children.

Graham won the 2002 Kate Greenaway Medal from the British librarians, recognising the year's best-illustrated children's book published in the UK, for the picture book Jethro Byrd, Fairy Child (Walker Books), which he both wrote and illustrated. (He donated the £5000 cash prize to refugees.) The story features a young girl who finds a tiny fairy family "in cement and weeds", contrary to her father's teaching. He also won a 2000 Smarties Prize, ages category 0–5 years, for Max and the 2002 Boston Globe-Horn Book Award, Picture Book, for "Let's Get A Pup!" Said Kate.

For his contribution as a children's illustrator, Graham was Australia nominee for the biennial, international Hans Christian Andersen Medal in 2012.

Biography
Graham was born in Sydney, Australia. He loved drawing and was greatly influenced by comics such as The Phantom and Mandrake.

He studied drawing and painting, went to the UK after graduation, returned to Sydney, and there began his career as an illustrator and designer. Between 1983 and 1995 he lived in Melbourne working as an illustrator for a publishing house, The Five Mile Press. He now lives in the UK and works on a monthly comic-strip for a French magazine, Les Belles Histoires as well as continuing to produce picture books.

In 1982 he illustrated the music and lyrics booklet for Australian Broadcasting Commission's Sing primary school music radio broadcast. A scene from Greetings from Sandy Beach was used as one in a series of Australia Post stamps celebrating the 50th anniversary of the annual Children's Book Council of Australia awards.

WorldCat reports from participating libraries that his most widely held work is How to Heal a Broken Wing, a 36-page picture book about a city boy who rescues an injured bird; published in 2008 by both Walker and its US division Candlewick Press. WorldCat libraries hold editions in Scottish Gaelic, French, Spanish, Catalan, and Chinese.

Awards and honours
Graham's books have received numerous honors and have been listed on several "best of" lists.

Eleven of Graham's books are Junior Library Guild selections: Max (2000), Tales from the Waterhole (2004), How to Heal a Broken Wing (2008), April and Esme, Tooth Fairies (2011), The Silver Button (2014), Vanilla Ice Cream (2014), How the Sun Got to Coco's House (2015), Home in the Rain (2017), The Underhills (2020), Ellie's Dragon (2021), and Maxine (2022).

The Cooperative Children's Book Center at the University of Wisconsin–Madison included nine of Graham's books in their year-end lists of the best books: "Let's Get a Pup" Said Kate (2001), Oscar’s Half Birthday (2005), "The Trouble with Dogs..." Said Dad (2007), How to Heal a Broken Wing (2008), April and Esme: Tooth Fairies (2010), A Bus Called Heaven (2012), The Silver Button (2013),How the Sun Got to Coco's House (2015), and Maxine (2021).

The Association for Library Service to Children (ALSC) has named the following as Notable Children's Books: "Let's Get A Pup,' Said Kate (2002), Oscar's Half Birthday (2006), Dimity Dumpty (2008), April and Esme, Tooth Fairies (2011), Home in the Rain (2018). ALSC also included Max (Reading Rainbow), an adaptation of Graham's Max, a Notable Children's Video in 2003.

School Library Journal named How to Heal a Broken Wing one of the best picture books of 2008. 

Two of Graham's books received fanfare from The Horn Book Magazine, meaning they were listed as the magazine's best books of the year. Fanfare books include April and Esme, Tooth Fairies (2010) and Home in the Rain (2017).

Kirkus Reviews named Vanilla Ice Cream one of the best picture books of 2014.

Vanilla Ice Cream was selected by Bank Street College of Education as one of the best books of 2015.

In 2017, Home in the Rain received a blue ribbon from The Bulletin of the Center for Children's Books.

Notes

References

External links

 Bob Graham at Focus on Fiction
  (Jethro Byrd, Fairy Child)
 Finding Aid for Bob Graham at the Lu Rees Archives

Australian children's writers
Australian children's book illustrators
Kate Greenaway Medal winners
Writers who illustrated their own writing
1942 births
Living people